The 2009–10 Arizona State Sun Devils women's basketball team will represent Arizona State University in the 2009–10 NCAA Division I women's basketball season. The Sun Devils will be coached by Charli Turner Thorne. The Sun Devils are a member of the Pacific-10 Conference and will attempt to win the NCAA championship.

Offseason
April 17, 2009: Sabrina McKinney and Tenaya Watson have signed national letters of intent to study and play basketball at Arizona State. Both will join the Sun Devils for the 2009-10 season.
McKinney will be coming to ASU from Bowie High School in Arlington, Texas She was a two-time District 4-5A Defensive Player of the Year. A four-year starter, McKinney led her team in both assists and steals three straight seasons.
Watson A 5-9 guard from Long Beach, California. She previously played at Central Arizona College where she played a major role in leading her team to a perfect 35-0 season and the NJCAA championship. She put up All-American numbers as she averaged 13.8 points, 5.4 assists (13th in the nation) and 3.9 steals (fourth in the nation) per game. She was named the MVP of the NJCAA Tournament after averaging 16.8 points in the Vaqueras' four tournament games.
April 30: Head coach Charli Turner Thorne will serve as head coach of the 2009 USA Basketball Women's World University Games Team. Suzy Merchant of Michigan State University and Julie Rousseau of Pepperdine University will serve as assistant coaches.

Preseason

Regular season
The Sun Devils participated in the Rainbow Wahine Classic in Hawaii from November 27–28. On December 4, the club will host the ASU Classic. Before the end of December, the Sun Devils will participate in the Desert Sun Classic in Las Vegas.

Roster

Schedule

Player stats

Postseason

Pac-10 Basketball tournament
 See 2010 Pacific-10 Conference women's basketball tournament

NCAA Basketball tournament

Awards and honors

Team players drafted into the WNBA

See also
2009-10 Arizona State Sun Devils men's basketball team
2009–10 NCAA Division I women's basketball season

References

External links
Official Site

Arizona State Sun Devils women's basketball seasons
Arizona State
Arizonia
Arizonia